Poulsson is a surname. Notable people with the surname include:

Annar Poulsson (1911–1996), Norwegian businessperson in the insurance industry
Emilie Poulsson (1853–1939), American children's author, campaigner for early childhood education
Erik Ø. Poulsson (1904–1987), Norwegian businessperson in the insurance industry
Jens-Anton Poulsson DSO, (1918–2010), Norwegian military officer
Magnus Poulsson (1881–1958), Norwegian architect

See also
Polson (disambiguation)
Poulson (disambiguation)